The Battle of West Hunan, also known as the Battle of Xuefeng Mountains and the Zhijiang Campaign, was the Japanese invasion of west Hunan and the subsequent Allied counterattack that occurred between 6 April and 7 June 1945, during the last months of the Second Sino-Japanese War. Japanese strategic aims for this campaign were to seize Chinese airfields and secure railroads in West Hunan, and to achieve a decisive victory that their depleted land forces needed.

This campaign, if successful, would also have allowed Japan to attack Sichuan and eventually the Chinese wartime capital Chongqing. Although Japan was able to make initial headways, Chinese forces with air support from the Americans were able to turn the tide and forced the Japanese into a rout, recovering a substantial amount of lost ground.

This was the last major Japanese offensive, and the last of 22 major battles during the war to involve more than 100,000 troops. Concurrently, the Chinese managed to repel a Japanese offensive in Henan and Hubei and launched a successful attack on Japanese forces in Guangxi, turning the course of the war sharply in China's favor even as they prepared to launch a full-scale counterattack across South China.

Background
By April 1945, China had already been at war with Japan for more than seven years. Both nations were exhausted by years of battles, bombings and blockades. From 1941–1943, both sides maintained a "dynamic equilibrium", where field engagements were often numerous, involved large numbers of troops and produced high casualty counts, but the results of which were mostly indecisive. Operation Ichi-Go in 1944 changed the status quo, as Japanese forces were able to break through the inadequate Chinese defenses and occupy most of Henan, Hunan and Guangxi, connecting Japanese-held areas from north to south in a continuous front.

However, the Japanese victory resulted in very little actual benefit for them: the operation drained Japanese manpower and a weakened Japanese army had to defend a longer front with more partisan activity in occupied areas. The opening up of north-south railway connections did little to improve Japanese logistics, for only one train ran from Guangzhou to Wuhan in April 1945, and due to fuel shortages the primary mode of transportation for Japanese troops was on foot.

On the other hand, although the Chinese government in Chongqing had lost land access to their remaining forces in Zhejiang, Anhui and Jiangxi with their defeat in Ichi-Go, Chinese fortunes in the war improved with the retaking of northern Burma by Allied and Chinese forces. On 4 February 1945, the first convoy of trucks reached Kunming from the British railhead in Ledo, India, over the newly completed 
Stilwell Road and the northern section of the Burma Road; using this road link, over 50,000 tonnes of petroleum started to arrive into China every month. By April 1945, enough materiel had become available to the Chinese army to equip 35 divisions with American equipment. A major counter offensive was planned.

Order of battle

China
Commander-in-Chief: He Yingqin
3rd Front Army: Tang Enbo
27th Army Group: Li Yutang
26th Corps: Ting Chih-pan 
 41st Division: Tung Gee-Tao 
 4th Division: Chiang Hsiu-jen
94th Corps: Mu Ting-fang 
 5th Division: Li Tse-fen
 43rd Division: Li Shih-lin
 121st Division: Ch Ching-min
New 6th Corps: Liao Yao-hsiang
 14th Division: Lung Tien-wu
 New 22nd Division: Li Tao

4th Front Army: Wang Yao-wu 
18th Corps: Hu Lien 
 11th Division: Yang Po-tao
 18th Division: Chin Tao-shan
 118th Division: Tai Pu
73rd Corps: Han Chun 
 15th Division: Liang Chi-lu
 77th Division: Tang Sheng-hai
 193rd Division: Hsiao Chuang-kuang
74th Corps: Shih Chung-cheng 
 51st Division: Chao Chih-tao
 57th Division: Li Yen
 58th Division: Tsai Jen-chieh
100th Corps: Li Tien-hsia 
 19th Division: Yang Yin
 63rd Division: Hsu Chih-hsiu
 13th Division: Chin Li-san
 6th Provincial Division: Chao Chi-ping
assorted independent units

10th Army Group; Wang Ching-chiu 
39th Corps; Liu Shang-chih  (uncommitted)
 51st Division; Shih Hun-hsi
92nd Corps; Hou Ching-ju 
 21st Division; Li Tse-fen
 142nd Division; Li Chun-ling (uncommitted)

Air Support (400 aircraft)
 Chinese Air Force
 1st Air Group
 2nd Air Group
 3rd Air Group
 5th Air Group
 U.S. Air Force
 14th Air Force

Sources

Japan
20th Army: Ichirō Banzai 
34th Division: Takeo Ban 
47th Division: Hiroshi Watanabe 
68th Division: Mikio Tsutsumi 
116th Division: Ginnosuke Uchida 
Elements of the 64th Division
86th Independent Mixed Brigade
Sources

Japanese strategic objectives
For this campaign, the Imperial Japanese had three main objectives. The first of which was to neutralize the Chinese airfield at Zhijiang, whose complement of USAAF and ROCAF was ensuring Allied air superiority in the region and a base for U.S. bombers, either by physically reaching the airfield, located only  from Chongqing, and securing it, or simply by pressing forward close enough to the airfield to force the Chinese to destroy the installation.

Their second objective was to secure their control of the Hunan-Guangxi and Guangzhou-Hankou railways. A third objective was to preemptively disrupt the planned Chinese offensive in the region.

Preparations for battle
By this point of the war, Japan was losing the battle in Burma and facing constant attacks from Chinese forces in the country side. Spare troops for this campaign were limited. The Japanese army began preparations for the battle in March 1945, constructing two highways with forced Chinese labor: the Heng-Shao Highway ran from Hengyang in a northwest direction to Shaoyang, a Japanese-controlled city in central Hunan a mere  from Zhijiang; and the Tan-Shao Highway from Xiangtan, southwest to Shaoyang. Supplies and equipment were stockpiled near Shaoyang, to be the headquarters of the Japanese 20th Corps, led by Ichiro Banzai. Under it were the Japanese 34th, 47th, 64th, 68th and 116th Divisions, as well as the 86th Independent Brigade, massing at various locations across Hunan, for a total of 80,000 men by early April.

In response, the Chinese National Military Council dispatched the 4th Front Army and the 10th and 27th Army Groups with He Yingqin as commander-in-chief. At the same time, it airlifted the entire New 6th Corps, an American-equipped corps and veterans of the Burma Expeditionary Force, from Kunming to Zhijiang. Chinese forces totaled 110,000 men in 20 divisions. They were supported by about 400 aircraft from the CAF 1st, 2nd, 3rd, 5th Air Groups and the USAAF 14th Air Force.

Battle
Japanese forces took over the outskirts of Hunan with little resistance. However, they didn't realize that the Chinese forces were well prepared for the Japanese assault. The mountainous terrain was ideal for ambushes and mortar bombardment on approaching Japanese forces in the lower grounds.

The Chinese also had air superiority in this battle. After some defeats Japan decided to retreat. However, Chinese forces gave chase and inflicted heavy casualties on the Japanese. The local Chinese guerrilla forces then attacked the Japanese positions. Japan ended up losing a large amount of territory that they once occupied.

The Japanese drove east while two smaller forces to the north and south moved generally parallel to the main column. The Chinese Combat Command's advisory and liaison system was immediately called into play. At a meeting on 14 April, the day after the Japanese general advance began, Generals Ho and McClure agreed on the basic plan to counter the enemy attack. Chinese armies would be concentrated to the north and south to prepare to strike the enemy advance in the flanks and rear. The Chinese center around Chihchiang would be strengthened by moving the New 6th Army, composed of two veteran divisions of the Burma campaign, into the area. 

By late April, the New 6th Army began concentrating at Chihchiang. Although their deployment from Burma diverted scarce fuel from the U.S. Fourteenth Air Force, American airmen continued to fly repeated missions against the attacking Japanese. Meanwhile, other Chinese armies moved into position, the 94th to the south and the 100th and 18th to the north. Meanwhile, the 74th Army, defending the Chinese center on a fifty-mile front, was putting up a stout resistance, slowing the Japanese advance. 

On 3 May a Chinese-American staff conference decided to counterattack a Japanese detachment near Wu-yang, seventy miles southeast of Chihchiang. The subsequent engagement by the 5th Division of the 94th Army on 5 and 6 May was completely successful. Over the next few days, the 5th and 121st Divisions, also of the 94th Army, repeatedly outflanked the Japanese and hustled them north. The Chinese 18th and 100th Armies moved into the Japanese rear. With the 94th Army threatening from the south, the Japanese were forced into a general retreat and by 7 June were back at their initial starting positions.

Casualties
After the battle, the Japanese first announced that they only had 11,000 casualties (5,000 KIA). They later revised the figures to include an additional 15,000 casualties "due to diseases". Finally, they admitted to a casualty figure of 27,000. On the other hand, the Chinese claimed to have inflicted on the Japanese 36,358 casualties, including 12,498 KIA. The Chinese sustained 20,660 casualties with 7,817 KIA, of which there were 823 officers.

References

Conflicts in 1945
West Hunan 1945
West Hunan, Battle of
1945 in China
1945 in Japan
Military history of Hunan
April 1945 events in Asia
May 1945 events in Asia
June 1945 events in Asia